Aubrey Fielder (29 August 1929 – 23 August 2005) was a British cross-country skier. He competed in the men's 15 kilometre event at the 1956 Winter Olympics.

References

1929 births
2005 deaths
British male cross-country skiers
Olympic cross-country skiers of Great Britain
Cross-country skiers at the 1956 Winter Olympics
Sportspeople from Dartford